Le Pallet is a commune in the Loire-Atlantique département in western France.

It lies on the river Sèvre Nantaise.

Population

Personalities
Peter Abelard (1079–1142), scholastic philosopher and theologian

See also
Communes of the Loire-Atlantique department

References

Communes of Loire-Atlantique